The Milano Baseball Club was a longtime member of the Serie A1 of the Italian Baseball League. The team was based in the city of Milan in Italy.

A successful team in the Serie A1, Milano won eight championship titles in a span of 13 seasons, 1958; from 1960 through 1962; from 1966–1968 and 1970, all under manager Luigi Cameroni. Besides, Milano won three straight European Cups from 1969–1971.

During their existence, the Milano club produced two of the four batting Triple Crown winners in Italian baseball history – Roberto Gandini in 1962 and Roberto Bianchi in 1991.

Sources

External links
A.S.D. Milano Baseball 1946

Baseball teams in Italy
Sport in Milan